Erskine Ramsey "Bub" Walker (1907 – December 31, 1963) was an American football player and coach. He served as the head football coach at Samford University–then known as Howard College–from 1944 to 1945, compiling a record of 0–10. Walker played college football at the University of Alabama from 1931 to 1933 as a halfback.

Walker played high school football in 1924 and 1925 at Ensley High School in Birmingham, Alabama before attending Marion Military Institute in Marion, Alabama. He was the brother of Peahead Walker, who was also a football coach. Walker died at the age of 56, on December 31, 1963, in Miami.

Head coaching record

References

External links
 

1907 births
1963 deaths
American football halfbacks
Alabama Crimson Tide football players
Samford Bulldogs football coaches
Marion Military Institute alumni
People from Ensley, Alabama
Sportspeople from Birmingham, Alabama
Coaches of American football from Alabama
Players of American football from Birmingham, Alabama